Universidad San Juan de la Cruz, also known as San Juan de la Cruz University, is a private university located in Costa Rica. It is authorized and accredited by the Consejo Nacional de Enseñanza Superior Universitaria Privada, the national council of higher education of Costa Rica. It has been authorized to award degrees in accounting and business administration since 1996, and in law since 1998.

References 

Universities in Costa Rica
Private universities and colleges
Business schools in Costa Rica